John Bridson (2 February 1863 – 1 February 1898) was an Australian cricketer. He played one first-class match for South Australia in 1883/84.

See also
 List of South Australian representative cricketers

References

External links
 

1863 births
1898 deaths
Australian cricketers
South Australia cricketers
Cricketers from Melbourne